Rush City is a city in Chisago County, Minnesota, United States. The population was 3,079 at the 2010 census. It is fifty-eight miles north of Minneapolis–Saint Paul.

History
Rush City was platted in 1870, and incorporated in 1874.

Geography

Rush City is along Rush Creek.

Transportation
Interstate 35 serves as a main route for the community.  Other main routes include Minnesota State Highway 361, 4th Street. Rush City is served by the Rush City Regional Airport.

Demographics

2010 census
As of the census of 2010, there were 3,079 people, 844 households, and 524 families living in the city. The racial makeup of the city was 80.5% White, 13.2% African American, 4.0% Native American, 1.3% Asian, 0.1% from other races, and 0.8% from two or more races. Hispanic or Latino of any race were 2.5% of the population.

There were 844 households, of which 35.1% had children under the age of 18 living with them, 40.8% were married couples living together, 15.8% had a female householder with no husband present, 5.6% had a male householder with no wife present, and 37.9% were non-families. 30.7% of all households were made up of individuals, and 12.8% had someone living alone who was 65 years of age or older. The average household size was 2.43 and the average family size was 3.01.

The median age in the city was 33.6 years. 17.8% of residents were under the age of 18; 12.3% were between the ages of 18 and 24; 37.9% were from 25 to 44; 21.8% were from 45 to 64; and 10.1% were 65 years of age or older. The gender makeup of the city was 64.9% male and 35.1% female.

2000 census
As of the census of 2000, there were 2,112 people, 705 households, and 461 families living in the city. The racial makeup of the city was 90.10% White, 4.66% African American, 1.33% Native American, 1.24% Asian, 0.05% Pacific Islander, 1.24% from other races, and 1.38% from two or more races. Hispanic or Latino of any race were 3.04% of the population.

There were 705 households, out of which 39.4% had children under the age of 18 living with them, 45.0% were married couples living together, 14.9% had a female householder with no husband present, and 34.5% were non-families. 28.5% of all households were made up of individuals, and 13.5% had someone living alone who was 65 years of age or older.  The average household size was 2.54 and the average family size was 3.06.

In the city, the population was spread out, with 26.3% under the age of 18, 11.9% from 18 to 24, 33.9% from 25 to 44, 14.2% from 45 to 64, and 13.7% who were 65 years of age or older.  The median age was 32 years. For every 100 females, there were 120.6 males.  For every 100 females age 18 and over, there were 120.5 males.

The median income for a household in the city was $41,466, and the median income for a family was $40,380. Males had a median income of $31,750 versus $21,813 for females. The per capita income for the city was $14,668. About 10.2% of families and 11.6% of the population were below the poverty line, including 16.6% of those under age 18 and 10.6% of those age 65 or over.

Economy
Rush City is the location for a state prison that houses just under 1000 male inmates.  The facility was opened in February 2000, is the newest state prison in Minnesota, and employs about 350 people.

Notable people
 Ruth Duccini – (1918-2014), actress, munchkin in The Wizard of Oz.  Born in Rush City.
Deona Knajdek – (1989-2021), social justice activist who was killed during a protest in Minneapolis.
 Clayton Tonnemaker – (1928-1996), former American football player

References

External links

 Rush City Area Chamber of Commerce
 Rush City School District – Independent School District #139
 Rush City Regional Airport
 Minnesota Correctional Facility–Rush City

Cities in Chisago County, Minnesota
Cities in Minnesota